Evan Alan Wright (born ) is an American writer, known for his extensive reporting on subcultures for Rolling Stone and Vanity Fair. He is best known for his book on the Iraq War, Generation Kill (2004). He also wrote an exposé about a top CIA officer who allegedly worked as a Mafia hitman, How to Get Away With Murder in America (2012).

Although some compare his writings to those of Hunter S. Thompson, Wright claims his biggest literary influences were Mark Twain and British-American author Christopher Isherwood. The New York Times called his military writing "nuanced and grounded in details often overlooked in daily journalistic accounts" and noted his use of "gallows humor".

Biography

Wright was born in Cleveland, Ohio, and grew up in Willoughby, Ohio. Both of his parents were lawyers. His father was a prosecutor, then the general counsel for a utility. Wright attended Hawken School, but was kicked out for selling marijuana and sent to a home for juvenile delinquents called the Seed.  He returned to Hawken and made state debate finals in high school. Wright studied at Johns Hopkins University and at Vassar College; he graduated from Vassar with a degree in medieval history. His first writing job was to interview South African political leader Mangosuthu Buthelezi, but it was for a small magazine that did not pay.

Hustler magazine
In 1995, he became the entertainment editor and chief pornographic film reviewer for Hustler magazine. In 2000, he wrote about the experience and the issues surrounding the pornography industry in an article for Salon, titled "Maxed Out", and for the LA Weekly, in a cover story titled "Scenes from My Life in Porn".

Immersion journalism
Starting in 1996 at Hustler, then at Rolling Stone, Time, and Vanity Fair, he wrote long features based on his immersion in subcultures ranging from radical environmentalists to neo-Nazis. Many of his essays focused on crimes or controversial figures, and were said by him to capture a "dark, untamed America" that resembled "the Wild West". Several of his essays were collected in the book Hella Nation, which Wright called a "sort of autobiography". His essays in Hella Nation were compared to Joan Didion's writings on California. Another reviewer called Hella Nation a "comically macabre portrait of American life".

Military reporting
In 2002, Wright went to Afghanistan on assignment for Rolling Stone.

In 2003, he was embedded with the 1st Reconnaissance Battalion of the United States Marine Corps during the early stages of the 2003 invasion of Iraq. Wright spent his entire time embedded in a recon team led by then Sergeant Brad Colbert. He was under fire with the Marines for several weeks, and accompanied them "on point"  (i.e., in the lead vehicle). One of the Marines in the unit told The New York Times, "He was in the worst possible place to have a reporter. During the first firefight, he took 10 rounds in his door." Wright expressed admiration for the Marines, but warned them that a reporter's motto is "charm and betray". He published a series of articles for Rolling Stone magazine titled "The Killer Elite" which, in 2004, received the National Magazine Award for Reporting, the top prize in magazine writing. He then wrote Generation Kill.

In 2007, he returned to Iraq when the surge in U.S. forces was beginning. Wright interviewed General David Petraeus and spent several weeks embedded with U.S. troops in Baghdad, Ramadi, and Diwania. He later criticized American television media for promoting misperceptions of the war. He also criticized some U.S. political leaders, including Senate Majority Leader Harry Reid, for calling the surge a failure before it had been fully implemented.

Television and film
HBO adapted Generation Kill into an eponymous television miniseries first aired in 2008; Wright is portrayed by Lee Tergesen. Wright himself served as a writer and consulting producer on the project, collaborating closely with Emmy-winning producer David Simon.

Wright was hired by Paramount to write a script about Miami's "Cocaine Cowboys" Jon Roberts and Mickey Munday for Peter Berg to direct.  The screenplay is based on a book Wright wrote about Roberts, published by Crown Books.  Actor Mark Wahlberg is producing the film and plans to star in it.

In 2010, it was announced that director Ole Bornedal was filming a movie inspired by an article Wright wrote for Time magazine called "Death of a Hostess". Wright's article was a profile of Japanese serial-rapist and killer Joji Obara he wrote in Tokyo for Time magazine.

In 2012, he released the book American Desperado, co-written with Jon Roberts, who was featured in the documentary Cocaine Cowboys.

Controversies
At least six of the Marines Wright wrote about in Generation Kill have claimed they were punished for the remarks he published. Spokesman Lieutenant Nathan Braden denied that any Marines were punished as a result of Wright's work.

In 2004, Wright wrote an op-ed in The New York Times criticizing the U.S. military for allowing Iraq's insurgents to obtain weapons.

Wright has criticized college creative writing programs, saying such programs produce bad writers.

Published works
 The Best American Crime Writing: 2003 Edition: The Year's Best True Crime Reporting ("Mad Dogs & Lawyers")
 The Best American Magazine Writing: 2004 (Best Reporting)
 Generation Kill (2004)
 Hella Nation (2009)
 American Desperado (with Jon Roberts) (2011)
 The Best American Magazine Writing: 2008 (Best Profile Writing)
 How to Get Away with Murder in America (2012)

Awards
 2004 – Los Angeles Times Book Prize for Generation Kill: Devil Dogs, Iceman, Captain America and the New Face of American War
 2004 – National Magazine Award for Reporting, the top prize in magazine writing
 2005 – J. Anthony Lukas Book Prize from the Columbia University School of Journalism and the Nieman Foundation
 2005 – PEN USA Literary Award in research nonfiction for Generation Kill: Devil Dogs, Iceman, Captain America and the New Face of American War
 2005 – General Wallace M. Greene, Jr., Award from the U.S. Marine Corps Heritage Society for writing the Best History of the Marine Corps
2008 – National Magazine Award for Profile Writing for his Vanity Fair profile titled "Pat Dollard's Hollywood"

References

External links

 
 An Excerpt of "Pat Dollard's Hollywood" from The Best American Magazine Writing 2008
 
 
 

Living people
1966 births
American male journalists
Vassar College alumni
American war correspondents
Writers from Ohio
21st-century American non-fiction writers
Hawken School alumni
21st-century American male writers